The 2021 LiftKits4Less.com 200 was the 8th stock car race of the 2021 NASCAR Camping World Truck Series season and the 8th iteration of the event. The race was brought back to the schedule as a permanent addition after fan interest, and the race was made the official throwback race for the Truck Series. The race was held on May 7, 2021 in Darlington, South Carolina at Darlington Raceway, a  egg-shaped oval permanent racetrack. The race took 147 laps to complete. After a massive crash near the end of the race took out almost all of the field, Sheldon Creed of GMS Racing would win the race, garnering his 6th win of his career and his first of the season. Ben Rhodes of ThorSport Racing and Carson Hocevar of Niece Motorsports would finish the podium, finishing 2nd and 3rd, respectively.

Background 

Darlington Raceway is a race track built for NASCAR racing located near Darlington, South Carolina. It is nicknamed "The Lady in Black" and "The Track Too Tough to Tame" by many NASCAR fans and drivers and advertised as "A NASCAR Tradition." It is of a unique, somewhat egg-shaped design, an oval with the ends of very different configurations, a condition which supposedly arose from the proximity of one end of the track to a minnow pond the owner refused to relocate. This situation makes it very challenging for the crews to set up their cars' handling in a way that is effective at both ends.

Entry list

Starting lineup 
Qualifying was determined by a qualifying metric system based on the last race, the 2021 WISE Power 200 and owner's points. As a result, John Hunter Nemechek of Kyle Busch Motorsports would win the pole.

Race

Pre-race ceremonies

Race recap

Post-race driver comments

Race results 
Stage 1 Laps: 45

Stage 2 Laps: 45

Stage 3 Laps: 57

References 

2021 NASCAR Camping World Truck Series
NASCAR races at Darlington Raceway
LiftKits4Less.com 200
LiftKits4Less.com 200